Poetica is the first album by the New York City based dance music act iiO. It was released in March 2005.

Six tracks from the album were released as singles; "Rapture", "At the End", "Smooth", "Runaway", "Kiss You" and "Is it Love?".

Track listing

Charts

References

2005 debut albums
IiO albums